The Ente was the world's first full-sized rocket-powered  aircraft. It was designed by Alexander Lippisch as a sailplane and first flown under power on June 11, 1928, piloted by Fritz Stamer as part of the Opel-RAK rocket program led by Fritz von Opel and Max Valier.

During the late 1920s von Opel had made a variety of demonstrations involving rocket-powered vehicles for the Opel company. He was assisted by the pyrotechnics manufacturer Friedrich Sander and the rocketry advocate Max Valier. In March 1928 the three men visited the Wasserkuppe, a mountain which had become the center of German gliding to investigate the possibility of fitting rockets to an aircraft. There they encountered some of Lippisch's revolutionary gliders, which because of their tail-less designs seemed suitable for adapting to rocket propulsion. Lippisch was able to demonstrate how models of his aircraft would fly with small rockets installed in them. In June von Opel, Sander, and Valier returned and bought one of his aircraft, the Ente, a canard design.

Two black powder rockets were installed, to be electrically fired by a switch in the cockpit. A counterweight system was also devised and placed under the cockpit floor which would automatically adjust the aircraft's center of gravity as the fuel of the rockets was consumed. The rockets were intended to be fired one after the other, to provide continuous thrust for as long as possible, and each had a burn time of around 30 seconds. Fritz Stamer, who had long been a test pilot for Lippisch's designs was selected to fly the aircraft. After one false start, the aircraft took off and flew a 1,500 metre (4,900 ft) circuit of the Wasserkuppe's landing strip.

On the second flight, the team decided to try firing both rockets together for increased thrust over a shorter period.  However, rather than burning properly one of the rockets exploded, punching holes in both wings and setting the aircraft alight. Stamer was nevertheless able to bring it down from a height of around 20 metres (65 ft) before hastily abandoning the Ente, which was burned beyond any hope of repair.

The Opel RAK.1 was developed as the successor to the "Ente", and was demonstrated successfully to the public in September 1929 with Fritz von Opel as pilot.

Specifications (RRG Raketen-Ente)

References

1920s German experimental aircraft
Glider aircraft
Rocket-powered aircraft
Aircraft first flown in 1928
Canard aircraft
Lippisch aircraft